The Cabinet of Kristensen was the government of Denmark from November 7, 1945, to November 13, 1947. The minority cabinet was, except for the foreign minister, fully composed of members of Venstre, led by Knud Kristensen. It was formed after the October 1945 elections, the first since the end of the Second World War.

List of ministers
The cabinet consisted of:

References

1945 establishments in Denmark
1947 disestablishments in Denmark
Kristensen, Knud